Coba is the archeological site of Pre-Columbian Maya civilization, in the state of Quintana Roo, Mexico.

Coba may also refer to:

Acronyms
 Cob(I)yrinic acid a,c-diamide adenosyltransferase, an enzyme
 Uroporphyrinogen-III C-methyltransferase, an enzyme
 College of Business Administration (disambiguation)
 Cost–benefit analysis

People
Yasuhiro Kobayashi (born 1959), a Japanese musician known professionally as coba

Given name

 Coba Ritsema (1876–1961), portrait painter from the Netherlands
 Coba Surie (1879–1970), Dutch painter
 Coba van der Lee (1893-1972), Dutch artist

Surname
 Camilo Coba (born 1986), Ecuadorian filmmaker and photographer
 Máel Coba mac Áedo (died 615), Irish king
 Cellach mac Máele Coba (died 658), Irish king, son of Máel Coba
 Mehdi Çoba (born 2000), Albanian footballer
 Ndoc Çoba (1870–1945), Albanian Minister of Finances in 1920
 Selim Çoba (died 1900), Albanian religious scholar
 Shaqe Çoba (1875–1954), Albanian feminist and suffragist

Other uses
 Coba Lake, Mexico
 Coba Höyük, also known as Sakçe Gözü or Sakçagözü, an archaeological site in Anatolia, Turkey
 Coba Coba, an album from the Peruvian band Novalima

See also
 Cobas (disambiguation)